Karl Holz may refer to:

 Karl Holz (Nazi) (1895–1945), Nazi Party leader of Gau Franconia and an SA Gruppenführer
 Karl Holz (violinist) (1798–1858), Austrian violinist in the Schuppanzigh Quartet
 Karl Holz (executive), former president of Disney Cruise Line

See also
 Karl Holtz (1899–1978), German artist and cartoonist